Ladies in Charge is a British television series which originally aired on ITV in 1986. It followed on from a pilot episode that appeared on the Storyboard anthology series in 1985.

Returning from the First World War where they have served as volunteer ambulance drivers, three woman join together to form an agency dedicated to helping those who are struggling.

Cast

Main
 Carol Royle as Diana Granville
 Julia Hills as Babs Palmer
 Julia Swift as Vicky Barton
 Graham Chinn as  Frank Sutton

Selected others
 Nigel Davenport as Count Litvinoff
 Hugh Grant as Gerald Boughton-Green
 Pam Ferris as Charlie
 Deborah Findlay as  Hetty
 Julian Glover as Ernest
 Patrick Newell as Maxwell
 Imelda Staunton as Edith
 Gavin Richards as Cosmo Keble
 Suzanne Bertish as  Clara Cane
 Kathy Burke as Daisy
 Robert Addie as Hugo
 Michael Gough as Arthur James
 Irene Worth as Countess Kutuzov
 Richard Vernon as Lord Brompton

References

Bibliography
 Maxford, Howard. Hammer Complete: The Films, the Personnel, the Company. McFarland, 2018.

External links
 

1986 British television series debuts
1986 British television series endings
1980s British drama television series
ITV television dramas
English-language television shows
Television series by Fremantle (company)
Television shows produced by Thames Television